Stateless may refer to:

Society 
 Anarchism, a political philosophy opposed to the institution of the state
 Stateless communism, which Karl Marx predicted would be the final phase of communism
 Stateless nation, a group of people without a nation-state
 Stateless society, a society that is not governed by a state
 Statelessness, the legal and social concept applicable to persons who are not citizens or subjects of any state

Computing 
 State (computer science), relating to the configuration of information
 Stateless protocol, a communications protocol that treats each request as an independent transaction that is unrelated to any previous request
 Stateless firewall, that treats each network frame (or packet) in isolation
 Stateless IP/ICMP Translation algorithm, an IPv6 translation mechanism

Music 
 Stateless (Lene Lovich album), 1978
 Stateless (band), an English electronica band
 Stateless (Stateless album), 2007
 Stateless (Unwed Sailor album), 2002
 "Stateless", a song by U2 from The Million Dollar Hotel: Music from the Motion Picture
 Stateless (Dirty Beaches album), 2014

Film and television 
 Stateless (TV series), a 2019 Australian drama series
 Stateless (film), a 2020 Canadian documentary films

See also
 State (disambiguation)